The 2021–22 Baylor Bears men's basketball team represented Baylor University in the 2021–22 NCAA Division I men's basketball season, which was the Bears' 116th basketball season. The Bears, members of the Big 12 Conference, played their home games at the Ferrell Center in Waco, Texas. They were led by 19th-year head coach Scott Drew. They finished the season 27–7, 14–4 in Big 12 Play to finish a tie for the regular season championship. They lost in the quarterfinals of the Big 12 tournament to Oklahoma. They received an at-large bid to the NCAA tournament as the No. 1 seed in the East Region, where they defeated Norfolk State in the First Round before getting upset in the Second Round by North Carolina.

This was the first season in which the terms "men's" and "women's" are needed to distinguish Baylor's basketball teams. Before this season, Baylor women's basketball had used the nickname "Lady Bears", but on September 3, 2021, the school announced that basketball, soccer, and volleyball, the last three Baylor women's sports still using "Lady", would use only "Bears" from that point forward.

Previous season
In a season limited due to the ongoing COVID-19 pandemic, the Bears finished the 2020–21 season 28–2, 13–1 in Big 12 play to win the regular season championship. In the Big 12 tournament, they defeated Kansas State in the quarterfinals before losing to Oklahoma State in the semifinals. They received an at-large bid to the NCAA tournament as the No. 1 seed in the South region. The Bears defeated Hartford and Wisconsin to advance to the Sweet Sixteen. They defeated Villanova and Arkansas to advance to the school's first Final Four since 1950. In the Final Four, they defeated Houston to advance to the school's first National Championship Game. In the championship, they defeated No. 1 overall seed Gonzaga to win the school's first National Championship.

Offseason

Departures
All players listed as "graduated" had the option to return in 2021–22. The NCAA ruled that the 2020–21 season, dramatically impacted by COVID-19, would not count against the eligibility of any basketball player. Also, declaration for the NBA draft does not necessarily lead to loss of college eligibility. Junior guard Mathew Mayer declared for the NBA draft, but withdrew his name from consideration and returned to Baylor.

2021 recruiting class

Roster

Schedule and results

|-
!colspan=12 style=| Regular Season

|-
!colspan=12 style=| Big 12 Tournament

|-
!colspan=12 style=| NCAA tournament

Rankings

*AP does not release post-NCAA Tournament rankings.^Coaches did not release a week 1 poll.

References

Baylor
Baylor Bears men's basketball seasons
Baylor
Baylor
Baylor